Haywood Christopher Owens (born March 1, 1979) is an American former professional basketball player.

College career
Owens played one year at Tulane University before moving at The University of Texas at Austin, where he graduated in 2002. On December 29, 2001, he suffered a season ending knee injury in a loss against Utah.

Professional career

Owens was selected by the Milwaukee Bucks in the 2nd round of the 2002 NBA Draft, but he was then traded to the Memphis Grizzlies. He played in one NBA game with the Grizzlies.

Owens' first and only NBA game was played on April 15, 2003 in a 86 - 97 loss to the Houston Rockets where he recorded 4 points and 1 rebound.

He then played in the United States Basketball League with the Cedar Rapids River Raiders. He arrived in Europe in 2004, signing with Banca Nuova Trapani, with whom he played 30 games, averaging 19.1 points and 9.1 rebounds per game.

In 2005, he moved to CB Granada of the ACB League, but he was released in January 2006. He spent the rest of the season in the Continental Basketball Association with the Sioux Falls Skyforce and in the Greek Basket League with Panionios.

For the 2006–07 season he signed with ALBA Berlin of Germany. The following year, he moved to Galatasaray of the Turkish Basketball League.

In 2008, he moved to BC Donetsk in Ukraine. He stayed there until February 2010, when he signed with Panellinios.

In September 2010. Owens signed with Gravelines in France, but he played only 4 games in the French League. In November 2010, he returned to Ukraine and signed with Azovmash for the rest of the season.

For the 2011–12 season he signed with KK Cedevita of Croatia. In July 2013, he signed a one-year deal with KTP-Basket of Finland.

In September 2014, he signed with Argentino de Junín of Argentina.

Personal life
He is the great-nephew of 1930s African-American track and field star, Jesse Owens, who won four gold medals at the 1936 Berlin Olympics.

Career statistics

NBA

Regular season

|-
| align="left" | 2002–03
| align="left" | Memphis
| 1 || 0 || 6.0 || .667 || – || – || 1.0 || 0.0 || 0.0 || 0.0 || 4.0

References

External links 

Personal Website
NBA.com Profile
Eurocup Profile
FIBA.com Profile
Basketball-Reference.com Profile
Eurobasket.com Profile
Spanish League Profile 
Greek League Profile 
Italian League Profile 

1979 births
Living people
ABA League players
African-American basketball players
Alba Berlin players
American expatriate basketball people in Argentina
American expatriate basketball people in Croatia
American expatriate basketball people in Finland
American expatriate basketball people in France
American expatriate basketball people in Germany
American expatriate basketball people in Greece
American expatriate basketball people in Italy
American expatriate basketball people in Spain
American expatriate basketball people in Turkey
American expatriate basketball people in Ukraine
American men's basketball players
Argentino de Junín basketball players
Basketball players from Akron, Ohio
BC Azovmash players
BC Donetsk players
BCM Gravelines players
CB Granada players
Duncanville High School alumni
Galatasaray S.K. (men's basketball) players
Greek Basket League players
KK Cedevita players
KTP-Basket players
Liga ACB players
Maroussi B.C. players
Medalists at the 2001 Summer Universiade
Memphis Grizzlies players
Milwaukee Bucks draft picks
Pallacanestro Trapani players
Panellinios B.C. players
Panionios B.C. players
Parade High School All-Americans (boys' basketball)
Power forwards (basketball)
Sioux Falls Skyforce players
Small forwards
Texas Longhorns men's basketball players
Tulane Green Wave men's basketball players
Universiade bronze medalists for the United States
Universiade medalists in basketball
21st-century African-American sportspeople
20th-century African-American sportspeople